Metanapis is a genus of araneomorph spiders in the family Anapidae, first described by Paolo Brignoli in 1981.

Species
 it contains five species:
Metanapis bimaculata (Simon, 1895) – South Africa
Metanapis mahnerti Brignoli, 1981 – Kenya
Metanapis montisemodi (Brignoli, 1978) – Nepal
Metanapis plutella (Forster, 1974) – Congo
Metanapis tectimundi (Brignoli, 1978) – Nepal

References

Anapidae
Araneomorphae genera
Spiders of Africa
Taxa named by Paolo Brignoli